Manush Georgiev (Bulgarian: Мануш Георгиев), better known as Manush Voivoda was a Bulgarian revolutionary from Ottoman Macedonia and a member of the Internal Macedonian-Adrianople Revolutionary Organization. He graduated from the Bulgarian schools in Strumitsa and Serres, and was later appointed as a teacher in the villages of Barbarevo, Robovo, Borievo and Stinik.

Pursued by the Ottoman authorities as a revolutionary, in 1903 Manush Georgiev became illegal and joined the band of Hristo Chernopeev, and then he was the secretary of the voivode Dimitar Popstamatov. From 1904 he was appointed titular district voivode in the Petrich region. Contributes to the strengthening of the local revolutionary committees, protects the Bulgarian population.He grew up in VMORO and from 1907 he was elected assistant to the Strumica district voivode.

Georgiev was killed in a shootout with the Ottoman army and Bashi-bazouk near the village of Dolna Ribnitsa in 1908.

References

1881 births
1908 deaths
Bulgarian revolutionaries
Members of the Internal Macedonian Revolutionary Organization
Bulgarian educators
Macedonian Bulgarians